is a railway station located in the city of Tsugaru, Aomori Prefecture, Japan, operated by the East Japan Railway Company (JR East).

Lines

Station layout
Koshimizu  Station has one ground-level side platform serving a single bi-directional track. There is a small waiting room on the platform but no station building. The station is unattended.

History
Koshimizu Station was opened on November 20, 1954 in the former village of Morita, Nishitsugaru District. With the privatization of Japan National Railways on April 1, 1987, it came under the operational control of JR East.

Surrounding area

References

External links

  

Stations of East Japan Railway Company
Railway stations in Aomori Prefecture
Gonō Line
Tsugaru, Aomori
Railway stations in Japan opened in 1954